Inktomi, also known as The Splat, is a prominent rayed impact crater  in diameter located in the southern hemisphere of Saturn's moon Rhea. Inktomi is thought to be the youngest surface feature on Rhea, with estimates ranging from 8 to 280 million years.

Origin and composition
The rayed ejecta pattern indicates an oblique impact occurred from the west. The impact ejected pure water ice from beneath Rhea's surface creating a region contrastingly lighter than the surrounding regions. Recent analysis of Cassinis VIMS data revealed clean water ice without impurities at the crater and in its ejecta. Reassessment of the images from orbit, using additional images taken from Inktomi and its surroundings, confirms a continuous ejecta blanket almost devoid of small craters, thus likely a more geologically recent impact. A 3-dimensional anaglyph constructed from Cassini VIMS images shows a hilly crater floor with a prominent but topographically low central peak complex. While regular radial secondaries occur outside of the continuous ejecta blanket associated with the bright rays, clusters of numerous small craters could be identified in the eastern part of the crater floor and in the adjacent continuous ejecta. These small craters were most likely created by material ejected from the Inktomi impact at a steep angle.

References

Impact craters on Saturn's moons
Rhea (moon)